Líonraí Gaeilge is the Irish language term for Irish Language Networks, a designation applicable to areas in both jurisdictions on the island of Ireland.

History
The Gaeltacht Act 2012 (in the Republic of Ireland) allowed for the formal designation by the cross-border body Foras na Gaeilge and the Irish Department of Media, Tourism, Arts, Culture, Sport and the Gaeltacht of certain areas as Líonraí Gaeilge or Irish Language Networks, outside the traditional Irish-speaking areas collectively known as the Gaeltacht. The designation recognises a certain level of community and State support for the Irish language, and is made by electoral division or settlement name. The designation is to be made where the commitment to the Irish language seems strong enough to justify it, and can be revoked if language plans are not followed-through successfully.

In February 2018, Foras na Gaeilge announced that five areas -  the Gaeltacht Quarter in West Belfast, Loughrea, Carn Tóchair, Ennis and the village element of Dublin suburb Clondalkin - were to be designated as the first Líonraí Gaeilge, subject to the committees in the networks co-formulating and adopting approved Irish language plans. Foras na Gaeilge have said that they expect to also designate other areas outside the Gaeltacht as Líonraí Gaeilge, although as of 2023, no new designations have been made.

See also

 Gaeltacht Irish speaking regions in Ireland.
 Gaeltacht Act 2012
 Bailte Seirbhíse Gaeltachta Gaeltacht Service Towns.
 Neo-Gaeltacht
 Irish language in Northern Ireland
 Irish language outside Ireland
 Scottish Gaelic Gaeilge na hAlban / Gàidhlig.
 Gàidhealtachd Scots Gaelic speaking regions in Scotland.

References

Irish words and phrases